Oakley Glacier, is a glacier in the Mountaineer Range that descends east from Mount Casey to merge with the floating tongue from the Icebreaker Glacier at Lady Newnes Bay, in Victoria Land, Antarctica. Mapped by U.S. Geological Survey (USGS) from surveys and U.S. Navy air photos, 1960–64. Named by Advisory Committee on Antarctic Names (US-ACAN) for Lieutenant Commander Donald C. Oakley, U.S. Navy (USN), Protestant chaplain with the winter party at McMurdo Station, 1967.

See also
 Falkner Glacier
 List of glaciers in the Antarctic
 List of Antarctic ice streams

References

Glaciers of Victoria Land
Borchgrevink Coast